The Maurice Vieux International Viola Competition (French: Le Concours International d'Alto Maurice Vieux) is an international music competition for viola players established in 1983 by the French viola society Les Amis de l'Alto. The competition is named for the French viola player and teacher Maurice Vieux.

Maurice Vieux International Viola Competition

See also
 List of classical music competitions 
 Lionel Tertis International Viola Competition
 Primrose International Viola Competition

References 
 Riley, Maurice W. (1991).  The History of the Viola, Volume II, 175-180.

External links 
 Les Amis de l'Alto

Music competitions in France